Arkansas Game and Fish Commission (AGFC) is a state agency of Arkansas, headquartered in Little Rock, Arkansas.

Steve N. Wilson of Norfork, Arkansas joined the agency in 1968 and became its director in 1979. He resigned in 2000 and died in 2021. In 2016, Jeff Crow took director position of the Arkansas Game and Fish Commission. Bryan Hendricks of the Arkansas Democrat-Gazette that Wilson "molded the Arkansas Game and Fish Commission into the organization it is today". In Arkansas, outdoor recreation produces more than 4.9 million dollars a day.

In 2020 the agency passed additional rules regarding fishing, both for pleasure and for commercial operations.

References

Further reading
 Comparing Appropriations and Operationsfor the 2017-2019 Bienniumwith requests for the 2019-21 Biennium

External links
 Arkansas Game and Fish Commission
State agencies of Arkansas